Apatelodes firmiana is a moth in the family Apatelodidae first described by Caspar Stoll in 1782. It is found from Mexico to Guyana

The wings are brown, shading into darker at the outer margin except the apex and the outer half of the inner margin. There is a subbasal brown patch and an apical minute triangle well below the costa.

References

Apatelodidae
Moths described in 1782